No Ordinary Girl is the debut studio album by Jordan Pruitt, released on February 6, 2007, by Hollywood Records. 

The album debuted and peaked at number 64 on the US Billboard 200 with 14,000 copies sold in its first week.

Track listing

Japanese edition

Bonus DVD
"Teenager" behind the scenes
"Outside Looking In" music video
"We Are Family" music video
"Jump to the Rhythm" music video

Charts

Release history

References

2007 debut albums
Hollywood Records albums
Jordan Pruitt albums